Sidewinder is the fourth album from Australian nu metal band Superheist, released on 3 May 2019 through Black Mountain Music. 
The album was announced on 1 April 2019 alongside the release of the first single "The Riot", and a music video for the track was released on the band's YouTube channel the same day. It is the first Superheist release to feature bassist Si Durrant since 2000's 8 Miles High and the first album to feature guitarist Keir Gotcher and former Devil You Know (now known as Light the Torch) drummer John Sankey. It is the final album to feature vocalist Ezekiel Ox before his departure in July 2020.

At the AIR Awards of 2020, the album was nominated for Best Independent Heavy Album or EP.

Track listing

Personnel

Superheist
 Ezekiel Ox – vocals
 dw Norton – guitar, keyboards
 Keir Gotcher – guitar
 Simon Durrant – bass
 John Sankey – drums

Additional musicians
 London – vocals on "Shockwaves"
 Dana Roskvist – vocals on "And So We Burn"

References

Superheist albums
2019 albums